Glipa azumai is a species of beetle in the genus Glipa. It was described in 1950.

References

azumai
Beetles described in 1950